Svetly is a rural locality (a settlement) in Andreyevskoye Rural Settlement, Alexandrovsky District, Vladimir Oblast, Russia. The population was 349 as of 2010. There are 9 streets.

Geography 
The village is located 15 km west from Andreyevskoye and 3 km north-east from Alexandrov.

References 

Rural localities in Alexandrovsky District, Vladimir Oblast